= Shrirampur (Rural) =

- city
- Location in Maharashtra, India
- Coordinates: 19.6149°N 74.6512°E
- Country: India
- State: Maharashtra
- District: Ahmednagar

Population (2001)
  - Total: 7,510

Languages
  - Official: Marathi
- Time zone: UTC+5:30 (IST)

Shrirampur (Rural) is a census town in Ahmednagar district in the Indian state of Maharashtra.

== Demographics ==
As of 2001 India census, Shrirampur(Rural) had a population of 7510. Males constitute 51% of the population and females 49%. Shrirampur(Rural) has an average literacy rate of 69%, higher than the national average of 59.5%: male literacy is 79%, and female literacy is 59%. In Shrirampur(Rural), 12% of the population is under 6 years of age.
